Indirect elections for the Moldovan Parliament (called Sfatul Țării) took place in Moldova in November 1917. The members were elected by the various congresses, soviets, parties and professional and ethnic organizations existing in Bessarabia in the wake of the Russian Revolution.

Background

On  , the Soldiers' council proclaimed the autonomy of Bessarabia, and summoned for the election of a representative body (diet), called Sfatul Țării. The council prescribed the number of representatives allocated to each organization, and imposed a fixed ethnic composition, significantly different from the one recorded by previous Russian Imperial censuses. Of the 150 Diet members of Sfatul Țării, 105 were Moldavians, 15 Ukrainians, 13 Jews, 6 Russians, 3 Bulgarians, 2 Germans, 2 Gagauzians, 1 Pole, 1 Armenian, 1 Greek, 1 unknown.

Aftermath

On , Sfatul Țării elected the Pantelimon Erhan Cabinet (named the Council of Directors General), with nine members and with Pantelimon Erhan as President of the Council of Directors General and Director General for Agriculture.

See also
 1918 Transylvanian legislative election

References

Elections in Moldova
Political history of Moldova
Parliamentary elections in Moldova
Staful Tarii
1917 in Russia
Moldavian Democratic Republic
November 1917 events